The Gottesman Libraries is located in Russell Hall at Teachers College, Columbia University at 525 West 120th Street, and is the sole library of Teachers College graduate school. It is one of the nation's largest and most comprehensive research libraries in education, and the scope of its collections reflect the historic commitment to advanced study in education, psychology, and the health professions in their local, national, and international dimensions. Its standard opening hours are Monday through Thursday 8am to 11pm, Friday 8am to 7pm, Saturday 12pm to 7pm, and Sunday 12pm to 11pm. The library supports numerous services, including online and in-person support, chat or real-time transmission of text messages, sponsored events, exhibits and displays, instructional offerings and research consultations, the Library Blog, and live musical performances. Automated acquisitions, interlibrary loan, printing, scanning, and room booking services are available. Historical collections focus on pedagogical research, curriculum and children's literature, and institutional history, with extensive material accessible via Pocket Knowledge, the digital archive. EDUCAT is the library's online searchable catalog, with library resources also discoverable through Summon TC SuperSearch.

In 2001 the library received a $6.5 million gift from Professor Ruth Gottesman, to establish 'the Library of the Future'. A dedication ceremony was held on November 4, 2004. Previously the library of Teachers College was known as Milbank Memorial Library, named after Thomas Milbank and dedicated as such in 1982. Before moving to Russell Hall in 1924, where it occupied four floors and the tower, it was located at 9 University Place, and known as the Bryson Library, named after Mrs. Peter M. Bryson.

Galleries 
The Gottesman Libraries features two art galleries; The Kasser Exhibition Space in the entrance of the first floor, and the Offit Family Gallery, on the third floor, located past the large reading room. In addition to these spaces, there is an exhibit area on the second floor, known for its congenial, collaborative setting, and the library has hosted art and exhibits in additional locations, including the Everett Cafe, also situated close to the entrance.

Smith Learning Theater 
The Smith Learning Theater is housed on the 4th floor of the Gottesman Libraries, and is designed to facilitate ambitious teaching and learning opportunities. The creation of the Smith Learning Theater was made possible by an $8 million gift from George and Camilla Smith, which allowed for the renovation of the 4th floor of the Gottesman Libraries, in order to create an "experimental and demonstration space" for Teachers College students and faculty. Architect firm Shepley Bulfinch, having executed prior renovations at the Gottesman Libraries, were responsible for the design,  allowing research into new ways of teaching. In 2019 it is estimated that the Smith Learning Theater will host approximately 88 events, involving up to half of all library staff. Events in the Smith Learning Theater are supported by the staff of the EdLab including producers, designers, documentarians, media producers, and learning experience service associates.

References

External links
 
 Smith Learning Theater

Columbia University Libraries
Libraries in Manhattan
Morningside Heights, Manhattan
University and college campuses in New York (state)